The 2017–18 Stephen F. Austin Lumberjacks basketball team represented Stephen F. Austin State University during the 2017–18 NCAA Division I men's basketball season. The Lumberjacks were led by second-year head coach Kyle Keller and played their home games at the William R. Johnson Coliseum in Nacogdoches, Texas as members of the Southland Conference. They finished the season 28–7, 14–4 in Southland play to finish in third place. They defeated Central Arkansas, Nicholls State, and Southeastern Louisiana to become champions of the Southland tournament. They received the Southland's automatic bid to the NCAA tournament where they lost in the first round to Texas Tech.

On May 20, 2020, following the discovery of an administrative error in certifying eligibility for student-athletes, Stephen F. Austin reached an agreement with the NCAA to vacate hundreds of wins across multiple sports from 2013 to 2019, including all 117 men's basketball wins from the 2014–15 to 2018–19 seasons.

Previous season
The Lumberjacks finished the 2016–17 season 18–18, 12–6 in Southland play to finish in a three-way tie for second place. They defeated Lamar in the quarterfinals of the Southland tournament to advance to the semifinals where they lost to Texas A&M–Corpus Christi. They were invited to the CollegeInsider.com Tournament where they lost in the first round to Idaho.

Roster

Schedule and results

|-
!colspan=9 style=| Non-conference regular season

|-
!colspan=9 style=| Southland regular season

|-
!colspan=9 !colspan=9 style=| Southland Conference tournament

|-
!colspan=9 !colspan=9 style=| NCAA tournament

See also
2017–18 Stephen F. Austin Ladyjacks basketball team
List of vacated and forfeited games in college basketball

References

Stephen F. Austin Lumberjacks basketball seasons
Stephen F. Austin
Stephen F. Austin Lumberjacks basketball
Stephen F. Austin Lumberjacks basketball
Stephen F. Austin